Lenine, artist name of Osvaldo Lenine Macedo Pimentel (born 2 February 1959), is a Brazilian singer-songwriter from Recife, Pernambuco. Between the years of 2002 and 2018, he has earned a total of seven Latin Grammy Awards, (including the 2005 awards for "Best Brazilian Contemporary Album" and "Best Brazilian Song").

Career
Lenine's career began at the age of 18, when he moved to Rio de Janeiro to compete in a music festival. In 1983, he released his first LP, Baque Solto, with partner Lula Queiroga. Ten years later, he released his second album, Olho de Peixe, with percussionist Marcos Suzano. Lenine's first solo record, O Dia em que Faremos Contato, was released in 1997, featuring a mixture of electronica, northeastern Brazilian rhythms and samba. Two years later, he released Na Pressão. In 2001, Falange Canibal was released. This album attracted international attention due to the appearance of the U.S. group Living Color performing with him on the song "O Homem dos Olhos de Raios-X". His next album In Cité (2004) was recorded live at the auditorium of the Cité de la Musique (City of Music) in Paris.

In 2005, Lenine won two Latin Grammys: one for "Best Brazilian Contemporary Album" and one for "Best Brazilian Song". His first North American release, a self-titled collection of his own compositions, was issued in 2006.

In addition to being a performer of note, Lenine is an accomplished composer for other artists; he possesses a catalog of over 500 songs written for artists including Maria Bethânia, Milton Nascimento, Daniela Mercury, and Zélia Duncan. Among Lenine's most famous songs is "Relampiano" (lightning strikes), about a child from the favela who sells candies at stoplights. This song, written with Paulinho Moska, was inspired by an encounter between them and a young street vendor in Rio de Janeiro.

In 2015, his album Carbono was nominated for the 16th Latin Grammy Awards in the Best MPB Album category, with the track "Simples Assim" being nominated for the Best Brazilian Song category.

His live album Em Trânsito was ranked as the 26th best Brazilian album of 2018 by the Brazilian edition of Rolling Stone magazine.

Discography
 1983 – Baque Solto – with Lula Queiroga
 1993 – Olho de Peixe – with Marcos Suzano
 1997 – O Dia em que Faremos Contato
 1999 – Na Pressão
 2001 – Falange Canibal
 2004 – In Cité – live album
 2006 – Lenine Acústico MTV – live album
 2007 – Breu
 2008 – Labiata – Wrasse Records (UK)
 2011 – Chão
 2013 – Triz
 2015 – Carbono
 2016 – The Bridge – Live at Bimhuis – with Martin Fondse Orchestra – live album
 2018 – Em Trânsito – live album
2021 – The Bridge II – with Martin Fondse - mini album

References

External links

 Lenine.com.br – Official website
 
 Interview (June 2008)
 Lenine's UK Label
 Lenine performing his song " A Ponte", live music video

1959 births
Living people
Brazilian rock singers
Música Popular Brasileira singers
Música Popular Brasileira guitarists
Brazilian male guitarists
Latin Grammy Award winners
People from Recife
Wrasse Records artists
Latin music songwriters
20th-century Brazilian male singers
20th-century Brazilian singers
21st-century Brazilian male singers
21st-century Brazilian singers
Brazilian male singer-songwriters
Six Degrees Records artists